Leonardo Gonçalves (born 1 March 1996) is a Brazilian judoka.

He is the gold medallist of the 2018 Pan American Judo Championships in the -100 kg category.

References

External links
 
 

1996 births
Living people
Brazilian male judoka
20th-century Brazilian people
21st-century Brazilian people